"Take It to the Head" is a song by American hip hop producer DJ Khaled, released as the lead single from his sixth studio album, Kiss the Ring. The song features American singer Chris Brown, rappers Rick Ross, Lil Wayne and Trinidadian American rapper Nicki Minaj. The song was premiered via DJ Khaled's Twitter on March 26, 2012. It was later released for digital download in the United States on April 3, 2012. The single was certified gold by the Recording Industry Association of America (RIAA) for sales of over 500,000 digital copies. Musically, "Take It to the Head" is a hip hop song with elements of trap from Nicki Minaj, Lil Wayne and Rick Ross, and R&B from Chris Brown.

Critical reception
David Jeffries highlighted it and wrote a positive description: " Nicki Minaj joins labelmate Wayne, along with Chris Brown and Rick Ross, for "Take It to the Head," a song perfect for rainy days as the lyricists go from sullen to champion over a slow-rolling Runners production." BBC music said of the single, "Single Take It to the Head, meanwhile, is oddly ineffectual considering the talent showcased. Rick Ross comes off lackadaisical, Nicki Minaj offers far from her greatest verse, a mumbling Lil Wayne's mouth sounds fuller of iced grill than usual, while Khaled hollers unselfconsciously over the whole palaver like an actual ghetto Tim Westwood." Mark Bozzer also wrote a positive review: "the Runners/Khaled-produced bachelorette party favourite, "Take It To The Head," featuring Breezy, Rozay, Nicki Minaj and Weezy." XXL panned the song noting it incapable of recapturing the magic of last album’s lead single but he also wrote that it's better than today’s average radio record: "appreciate in listening value over time."

Music video
The video was filmed on April 30, 2012 inside Disaster!: A Major Motion Picture Ride...Starring You!, one of the rides in Universal Studios Florida. It was directed by Colin Tilley. It premiered on May 20, 2012 on MTV2 Sucker Free and it was uploaded on DJ Khaled's Vevo account on May 25. In addition to Khaled and the track's featured artists, the video features cameos from rappers Drake, Birdman, Busta Rhymes and Mack Maine, among others. The video takes place at The BART. Brown appears in a cage as he sings the chorus. Rick Ross performs his verse on the sidelines of the train tracks as during the verse, Drake appears. Then Minaj raps her verse sitting on the train tracks as gasoline barrels on fire behind her. Then Wayne performs on the back of a destroyed train as Busta Rhymes, Mack Maine and Birdman make small appearances during Wayne's verse.

Remix
The remix features Chris Brown, Fat Joe, Ace Hood, Jae Millz, Maino, Lil Twist, T-Streets, Bun B and Lil Chuckee.

Live performances
Minaj and Wayne performed the song during Minaj's Pepsi Promotional Show as a part of her Pink Friday Tour. Minaj has also recited her verse on her Pink Friday: Reloaded Tour.

Charts

Weekly charts

Year-end charts

Certifications

Release history

References

2012 songs
2012 singles
DJ Khaled songs
Chris Brown songs
Nicki Minaj songs
Rick Ross songs
Lil Wayne songs
Songs written by Kevin Cossom
Songs written by Nicki Minaj
Songs written by Lil Wayne
Cash Money Records singles
Music videos directed by Colin Tilley
Songs written by Rick Ross
Song recordings produced by the Runners
Songs written by Jermaine Jackson (hip hop producer)
Songs written by Andrew Harr
Songs written by Andre Davidson
Songs written by Sean Davidson
Song recordings produced by the Monarch (production team)